Kalis  is a settlement in the administrative district of Gmina Jeziorany, within Olsztyn County, Warmian-Masurian Voivodeship, in northern Poland.

Population
The settlement has a population of 80.

References

Kalis